San Isidro Buensuceso or San Isidro Buen Suceso is a town in the municipality of San Pablo del Monte, Tlaxcala, Mexico, on the southern slope of La Malinche volcano. The town is named after Saint Isidore the Laborer, whose feast day is celebrated on May 15 each year.

The people of San Isidro Buensuceso are indigenous Nahuas; the first language of children is Nahuatl. It is the most remote Nahuatl-speaking town in Tlaxcala.

References

Bibliography

Populated places in Tlaxcala